Ahmad Bag Komasi (1796–1877) was a Kurdish poet and a disciple of Yusuf Yaska. Komasi wrote in Gorani and is best known for an elegy he wrote for his deceased wife which became popular around Kurdistan.

Life and elegy 
Ahmad Bag Komasi was from the Komasi tribe who lived near Sanandaj in Ardalan. The verses of his elegy consisted of two rhyming hemistiches, each of ten syllables divided by the caesura into two groups of five syllables. The verses had no consideration for length. The elegy begins with Komasi restoring the tomb of his wife and venting his sorrow. He is anxious over his beloved lying in darkness and cold, and remembers her hair and eyes. The elegy contains some typical Islamic characterizations including the name of his wife Leyla, calling his wife "a walking cypress", and the idea of a fire of separation between the two. In regards to Gorani literature, he took a liberal stance on its frameworks.

Elegy 
A portion of the elegy dedicated to his wife:

References 

1796 births
1877 deaths
18th-century Kurdish people
19th-century Kurdish people
Kurdish poets
People from Kurdistan Province